Paracyclois is a genus of crabs in the family Calappidae, containing the following species:
 Paracyclois atlantis Chace, 1939
 Paracyclois milneedwardsii Miers, 1886

References

Calappoidea